Daniel Joseph Poliziani (January 8, 1935 – November 30, 2019) was a Canadian professional ice hockey right winger who played four National Hockey League games (one regular season and three playoff contests) for the Boston Bruins during the 1958–59 season. The rest of his career, which lasted from 1955 to 1965, was mainly spent in the minor American Hockey League.

Poliziani was born to Italian immigrants, Santo and Eurosia, in New Waterford, Nova Scotia in 1935 and began playing hockey in the early 1940s when his family moved to Hamilton, Ontario following his father's death. He died in November 2019 at the age of 84.

Career statistics

Regular season and playoffs

References

External links
 

1935 births
2019 deaths
Barrie Flyers players
Boston Bruins players
Canadian ice hockey right wingers
Cleveland Barons (1937–1973) players
Hershey Bears players
Ice hockey people from Nova Scotia
Providence Reds players
Quebec Aces (QSHL) players
St. Catharines Teepees players
Sportspeople from the Cape Breton Regional Municipality